Maya Forstater (born 3 July 1973) is a British business studies and international development researcher who is the claimant in Maya Forstater v Centre for Global Development. The case established that gender critical views are protected as a belief under the Equality Act 2010, while stating that the judgment does not permit misgendering transgender people with impunity. At a subsequent full merits hearing, the Employment Tribunal upheld Forstater's case, concluding that she had suffered direct discrimination on the basis of her gender critical beliefs.

Career 
Forstater holds a degree from the Newcastle University. In 2002, she co-authored a technical report for the United Nations Industrial Development Organization on corporate social responsibility for small and medium enterprises. She has published academic research on corporate responsibility and illicit financial flows. Her collaborators include Simon Zadek and Peter Raynard. She has been senior researcher for the United Nations Environment Programme Inquiry into The Design of a Sustainable Financial Systems and in 2015 she became a consultant at the Center for Global Development (CGD), a think-tank that campaigns against poverty. She described her work as being "in a field of technocratic activism: think tank research, where people are expected to be mission driven and to share their personal, evidence based, opinion in order to influence public policy debates towards socially beneficial goals".

Legal case 

In 2019 Forstater's consulting contract for CGD was not renewed after she published a series of social media messages describing transgender women as men during online discourse regarding potential reforms to the Gender Recognition Act, which led to concerns being raised by staff at CGD. Forstater challenged the non-renewal of her contract at the Central London Employment Tribunal. In December 2019, a hearing was held to establish whether Forstater's beliefs qualified as a protected belief under the Equality Act 2010.  Judge Tayler ruled that they did not, stating that her gender critical views were "incompatible with human dignity and fundamental rights of others".

Forstater appealed against the judgment, and this was heard by the Employment Appeal Tribunal in April 2021. Judgment was reserved with the decision in her favour published on 10 June 2021. As with the original hearing, the appeal was on the narrow issue of whether her beliefs were protected under the Equality Act, therefore amounting to a protected belief. The judgment found that Forstater's gender critical beliefs were protected, meeting the final requirement in Grainger plc v Nicholson, specifically that they were "worthy of respect in a democratic society". However, in its judgment, the Tribunal clarified that this finding does not mean that people with gender critical beliefs can express them in a way that discriminates against trans people. A full merits hearing on Forstater's claim that she lost her employment as a result of these beliefs was heard in March 2022 with the decision delivered in July 2022. The decision of the Employment Tribunal upheld Forstater's case, concluding that she had suffered direct discrimination on the basis of her gender-critical beliefs. Remedies for the discrimination will be determined at a later date.

Campaigning 
In March 2019, Forstater criticised the Minister for Women and Equalities, Penny Mordaunt, for her Mumsnet webchat on International Women's Day. Mordaunt received many questions regarding women and transgender people that she did not answer. Forstater wrote in the Independent that Mordaunt had asked for "discussions on the topic of sex and gender identity to take place in a 'climate of respect, empathy and understanding', but when faced with a group of mothers asking respectful and carefully researched questions, she ducked and ran".

In October 2020, she became a founding officer of lobby group Sex Matters.

In late-May 2021, Forstater commented under an article published in The BMJ that she believed gender identity should not be used in the collection of sex data for medical matters. The authors of the article responded that she had "misrepresented" their point, as they were not advocating that gender identity be used as a proxy for sex, but rather that "relevant and accurate information about a person’s body and health needs cannot reliably be assumed with sex assigned at birth data." In their response, the article's authors emphasised that "many cisgender and transgender people have the ability to become pregnant".

In an article published in March 2021 in the Journal of Philosophy of Education, Judith Suissa and Alice Sullivan cited Forstater's case as an example of women who "face campaigns of harassment, including attempts to get them fired" for discussing the rights of women and girls and the potential conflicts this may have with campaigns for transgender rights. Forstater's experiences are referred to in Kathleen Stock's book Material Girls: Why Reality Matters for Feminism in the context of how Stonewall might influence court rulings.

In May 2021, she was among 41 signatories to an open letter calling on the Equality and Human Rights Commission (EHRC) to end its membership of the Stonewall Diversity Champions scheme, and on the Committee on Standards in Public Life to oversee a review of "the role of Stonewall in public life" and its "influence and control" over the Human Resources policies of public institutions. Later that month, the EHRC withdrew its membership in the Stonewall scheme.

In 2021, Baroness Falkner of Margravine, the new EHRC chair, mentioned Forstater in her first interview after taking office, citing her as someone who had faced abuse for her views and stating that "a lot of people would find [it] an entirely reasonable belief" that "people who self identify as a different sex are not the different sex that they self identify." Forstater was an invited speaker to a University of Cambridge student event on the topic of freedom of speech and belief.

In December 2021, Forstater received an apology from The Scout Association after a complaint was made against her, and published the text of the apology on her website. Forstater had described the complaint as "vexatious".

On 17 April 2022, The Guardian published an editorial on LGBT rights, calling for the government to ban conversion therapy for trans people and noting that countries which have done so have followed the path of supported exploration without pushing in either direction. On 20 April, the newspaper published a letter from Forstater and Helen Joyce in response to the editorial. The letter said that "children who are not 'affirmed' in their cross-sex identifications 'outgrow those feelings' and that 'common underlying causes' [of "gender distress"] include the stirrings of same-sex attraction, undiagnosed autistic-spectrum disorder, trauma from sexual abuse and, for many teenage girls, living in a sexist, porn-saturated world." They added that children were "fast-tracked" into medical interventions in countries that had banned conversion therapy, a situation they characterised as the "true conversion therapy".

Personal life
Forstater is a daughter of film producer Mark Forstater.

Selected works

References

External links
 Academia.edu Profile
 

1973 births
Living people
British activists
Alumni of Newcastle University
British feminists
Freedom of speech in the United Kingdom
Feminism and transgender
International development
People from London
Equality rights
British women's rights activists
British people of American descent
British people of Jewish descent